When rapping, MCs use braggadocio to boast—to speak about themselves with great pride. Braggadocio may include subjects such as physicality, fighting ability, financial riches, 
sexual prowess, or "coolness". Often heavily used in battle rap, braggadocio lyrics can range from just saying, "I'm the best MC ever," to using elaborate phraseology and wit.

Early years
Competition from the old-school hip hop ethic partially explains why braggadocio is used in rap—"my shit is better than yours and that's the bottom line," said MC Esoteric. Gangsta rap helped develop the idea of a "larger-than-life" persona, sometimes to a comedic extreme; however, reading braggadocio literally and seeing it as integral to rap may suppress vulnerability, i.e. an artist's ability to connect emotionally. Braggadocio may also reflect young black men's relief with being given an audience—rapper Murs said, "when you get the microphone, you want to pump yourself up."

Common subjects of braggadocio

Wealth
According to Pitchfork, "the accumulation of wealth and aspirational living are central themes in rap because, of course, it’s the music of America’s marginalized communities". It cites examples including Wu Tang Clan's C.R.E.A.M. and Eric B. & Rakim's Paid in Full.

Status symbols
Material goods a status symbols are a common topic for rap braggadocio. Frequently cited items include high-end cars, designer fashion, jewellery (sometimes called bling), and alcoholic drinks like Cristal champagne and Hennessy.

Self-aggrandizement
Rap's braggadocio need not be focused on material wealth, however. It can also be self-referential—talking, about the rapper's artistic or poetic ability. Paul Edwards's book How to Rap explains a short but complex example of braggadocio: Calling himself Alpha, the first letter of the Greek alphabet, then saying "no Omega" (the last letter), Rakim is suggesting that his flow could last forever—that he starts without ever stopping.

The term did not originate as a rap term; its origins are much older. The term originated in the late 16th century and denotes a boaster. It is from Braggadocchio, the name of a braggart in Spenser's The Faerie Queene. It is a composite of the word brag or braggart, and the Italian suffix , denoting something large of its kind.

See also
 Bling-bling
 Bugatti (song)

References

Bibliography

 
 
 

Rapping